The term PLOKTA (sometimes rendered in lowercase, plokta) /plok't*/ is an acronym for Press Lots Of Keys To Abort, and essentially means pressing random keys in an attempt to get some response from a (computer) system.

One might plokta when the abort procedure for a program is not known, or when trying to figure out if the system is just sluggish or really hung. Plokta can also be used while trying to figure out any unknown key sequence for a particular operation. Someone going into "plokta mode" usually places both hands flat on the keyboard and mashes them down, hoping for some useful response. This will sometimes eventually result in beeping sounds from an unresponding computer as its keyboard buffer fills up.

A slightly more directed form of plokta could often be seen in email messages or Usenet articles from new users with terminal-based clients - the text might end with 

       ^X^C
       q
       quit
       :q
       :q!
       ^C
       end
       x
       exit
       ZZ
       ^D
       ?
       help

as the user vainly tries to find the right exit sequence, with the incorrect tries piling up at the end of the message.

Computer jargon